Gap Dream is an American psychedelic synthpop band founded by Gabe Fulvimar in 2012 in Fullerton, California. As the band’s singer, songwriter and instrumentalist, Fulvimar is the only regular member of Gap Dream and solely responsible for its musical direction. In live performances, Fulvimar is accompanied by guitarist Corey Lanigan, and bassist Bobby May.

Gap Dream’s sound owes its origins to Fulvimar’s love of 60s psychedelic pop combined with his interest in vintage synthesizer sounds. Born in Akron, Ohio, he grew up listening to Sonic Youth, Pavement and was in an early version of The Black Keys.

In 2010, Fulvimar met Burger Records cofounder Lee Rickard during a Burgermania artist tour, which had stopped in Cleveland, Ohio, Fulvimar’s home at the time. Inspired by the Burger artists performing that day, he kept in touch with the Burger team, eventually sending them a sampling of self-recorded demos. Impressed, Burger released Gap Dream’s self-titled album on cassette in January 2012, followed by the January 2013 release Shine Your Light, a project on which he collaborated with Conspiracy of Owls guitarist/vocalist Bobby Harlow.
In December 2013, Fulmiver’s Gap Dream project covered The Velvet Underground's "Sister Ray", Lou Reed's 17-minute ode to the gritty underside of New York City, on Burger Records' White Light/White Heat tribute.

Discography

Albums 

This Is Gap Dream (2016, Burger Records)
Shine Your Light (2013, Burger Records)
Gap Dream (2012, Burger Records)

Singles 

Ali Baba (2012, Suicide Squeeze Records)
Chill Spot b/w Peter's Brother  (2013, Burger Records)
Generator b/w A Little Past Midnight 2012
Peter's Brother (Instrumental Version) (2013 Burger Records, Philthy Phonographic Records)
Shine Your Love  (2013, Fat Possum Records)

References

External links 

Gap Dream Facebook page

American psychedelic rock music groups
American pop music groups
Musical groups established in 2012
Musical groups from Orange County, California
2012 establishments in California